Glover is the primary village and a census-designated place (CDP) in the town of Glover, Orleans County, Vermont, United States. As of the 2020 census, it had a population of 256, out of 1,114 in the entire town of Glover.

The CDP is in southeastern Orleans County, along the northern edge of the town of Glover. It is bordered to the north by the town of Barton. Vermont Route 16 runs through the community, leading north  to Barton village and southwest  to Hardwick. 

The Barton River flows northward through the village; it is the southernmost tributary of Lake Memphremagog.

References 

Populated places in Orleans County, Vermont
Census-designated places in Orleans County, Vermont
Census-designated places in Vermont